Connolly v Woolrich (1867), 17 RJRQ 75, 11 Low Can Jur 197, is a decision in which the Quebec Superior Court held that a marriage under Cree law could be recognized under Quebec law. 

In 1803, Suzanne, a Cree woman (born Miyo Nipiy), married William Connolly, a North West Company employee in the district of Athabasca. They married in accordance with Cree law under wikihtowin and lived together for over 20 years. William eventually divorced Suzanne and married Julia Woolrich. 

One of William's sons with Suzanne later sued for a portion of William's estate. The Quebec Superior Court thus had to decide whether a marriage under Cree law could be recognized in Quebec. It decided that it could, a result that was affirmed on appeal. In deciding for the plaintiff, the court held that the Crown's declaration of sovereignty in Canada did not negate "the territorial rights, political organization, such as it was, or the laws and usages of the Indian tribes".

Connolly is considered a leading case, although its value as a precedent is unclear because the events giving rise to the decision took place when neither Canada nor the British Empire had passed legislation governing the Northwest Territories. John Borrows argues, however, that Connolly "affirmed the existence of Cree law on the prairies and recognized it as a part of Canadian law".

References

Sources

External links 
 Text of the decision as reported in Lower Canada Jurist

1867 in Canadian law
Canadian Aboriginal and indigenous law